Shurtliff is a surname. Notable people with the surname include:

Laurence Shurtliff (1945–2006), American music executive and roadie 
LaWanna Shurtliff (1935–2020), American politician
Lewis W. Shurtliff (1835–1922), American politician and Mormon missionary and leader

See also
Shurtleff